Gulnabat Kadyrova (born 14 June 1994) is a Turkmenistan weightlifter. She competed in the women's 69 kg event at the 2016 Summer Olympics.

Career 
She competed at the 2016 Summer Olympics in the 69 kg division. Gulnabat finished her performance with the result of 195 kg in the combined event, which was not only her personal achievement, but also a new national record for Turkmenistan.

She participated at the 2020 Asian Weightlifting Championships in Tashkent and won a silver medal in the 71 kg division.

Major results

References

External links
 

1994 births
Living people
Turkmenistan female weightlifters
Olympic weightlifters of Turkmenistan
Weightlifters at the 2016 Summer Olympics
Place of birth missing (living people)
Weightlifters at the 2018 Asian Games
Asian Games competitors for Turkmenistan
20th-century Turkmenistan women
21st-century Turkmenistan women